Baszkówka is an L5 ordinary chondrite meteorite which fell on 25 August 1994 in Baszkówka village, 23 km SSW of Warsaw. The fall occurred at around 4:00 pm. Several people heard a sonic boom, and one woman witnessed a movement on the surface of cultivated land 200 m away from her. A single specimen of a meteorite with radial regmaglypts was recovered immediately.

See also
 Glossary of meteoritics
 Meteorite fall

External links
 Meteorical Bulletin Database: Baszkówka

Meteorites found in Poland
1994 in Poland